Paul Peel (7 November 1860 – 3 October 1892) was a Canadian figure painter. Having won a medal at the 1890 Paris Salon, he became  one of the first Canadian artists to receive international recognition in his lifetime.

Career and life

Peel was born in London, Ontario, and received his art training from his father from a young age. Later he studied with William Lees Judson and at the Pennsylvania Academy of the Fine Arts with Thomas Eakins (1877-1880). He then moved to Paris in 1881, France where he studied at the École nationale supérieure des Arts Decoratifs, later enrolling in the atelier of Jean-Léon Gérôme at the École des Beaux-Arts. He studied afterwards with Jean-Joseph Benjamin-Constant in his private atelier and then with him at the Académie Julian as well as with Henri Doucet and Jules Lefebvre (1877-1890). In 1883, he exhibited his first painting at the Paris Salon, where he would continue to exhibit regularly until 1892. His paintings have a conservative quality, but a few later works reveal that he was a convert to Impressionist colour and light.

In 1882, he married Isaure Verdier. They had two children: a son (Robert Andre, in 1886) and a daughter (Emilie Marguerite, in 1888).

Peel travelled widely in Canada and in Europe, exhibiting as a member of the Ontario Society of Artists and the Royal Canadian Academy of Arts. He also exhibited at international shows like the Paris Salon, where he won a bronze medal in 1890 for his painting After the Bath. He was known for his often sentimental nudes and for his pictures of children; he was among the first Canadian painters to explore the nude as a subject.

He contracted a lung infection and died in his sleep, in Paris, France, at the age of 31.

His childhood home is one of the many attractions at the Fanshawe Pioneer Village in London, Ontario.

Major works

Listed chronologically:
Devotion (1881)
Listening to the Skylark (1884)
Mother and Child (1888)
The Young Botanist (1888–1890)
A Venetian Bather 1889
Portrait of Gloria Roberts (1889)
After the Bath (1890)
The Young Biologist (1891)
The Little Shepherdess (1892)
Robert Andre Peel (c. 1892)
Bennett Jull (1889–1890)

References

Bibliography 
 Victoria Baker, Paul Peel: A Retrospective, 1860-1892 (London Regional Art Gallery: London ON, 1986)

External links

Biography at the Canadian Encyclopedia
Biography at the Dictionary of Canadian Biography Online
Paul Peel fonds at the National Gallery of Canada, Ottawa, Ontario

1860 births
1892 deaths
19th-century Canadian painters
Canadian male painters
Artists from London, Ontario
Persons of National Historic Significance (Canada)
Canadian alumni of the École des Beaux-Arts
Académie Julian alumni
Pont-Aven painters
Students of Thomas Eakins
Canadian Impressionist painters
19th-century Canadian male artists
Members of the Royal Canadian Academy of Arts